Procyclidine is an anticholinergic drug principally used for the treatment of drug-induced parkinsonism, akathisia and acute dystonia, Parkinson's disease, and idiopathic or secondary dystonia.

Uses 
It is used in patients with parkinsonism and akathisia, and to reduce the side effects of antipsychotic treatment given  for  schizophrenia. Procyclidine is also a second-line drug for the treatment of Parkinson's disease.  It improves tremor but not rigidity or bradykinesia.

Procyclidine is also sometimes used for the treatment of dystonia (but not tardive dyskinesia), a rare disorder that causes abnormal muscle contraction, resulting in twisting postures of limbs, trunk, or face.

Overdose 
Signs of procyclidine overdose are those of an anticholinergic and include confusion, agitation and sleeplessness that can last up to or more than 24 hours. Pupils become dilated and unreactive to light. Tachycardia (fast heart beat), as well as auditory and visual hallucinations have also been reported.

Other known symptoms of overdose are: clumsiness or unsteadiness, being severely drowsy, having a severely dry mouth, nose, or throat, having an altered mood or other mental changes, seizures, being short of breath or having troubled breathing, a dry and warm, flushed skin.

A suspected overdose with severe life-threatening symptoms should immediately be brought to medical attention, where reversal can be attempted with physostigmine administered intravenously or subcutaneously.

Synthesis

Procyclidine, 1-cyclohexyl-1-phenyl-3-pyrrolidinopropan-1-ol, is synthesized in exactly the same manner as was seen for trihexyphenidyl, except this time the linear synthesis begins with the preparation of 3-(1-pyrrolidino)propiophenone.

In an interesting variation, the ketone is first reacted with phenylmagnesium bromide. Catalytic hydrogenation of the carbinol thus obtained can be stopped after the reduction of only one aromatic ring.

Side Effects
Side effects include nausea, constipation, urinary retention, blurred vision, anxiety, cognitive impairment, confusion, dizziness, gingivitis, hallucination, memory loss, rash and vomiting.

See also 
Biperiden
Cycrimine

References

Further reading 
 

Tertiary alcohols
Chlorides
Muscarinic antagonists
Pyrrolidines
Tardive dyskinesia
Cyclohexyl compounds